Boytsevo is a rural locality (a village) in Denyatinskoye Rural Settlement, Melenkovsky District, Vladimir Oblast, Russia. The population was 70 as of 2010.

Geography 
Boytsevo is located 26 km north of Melenki (the district's administrative centre) by road. Levino is the nearest rural locality.

References 

Rural localities in Melenkovsky District